Ancient Melodies of the Future is the fifth full-length album by indie rock band Built to Spill. The core line-up of the band remained as it had for the previous two albums, with singer/guitarist Doug Martsch, bassist Brett Nelson, and drummer Scott Plouf. The album was recorded at Bear Creek in Woodinville, Washington, with overdubs recorded at Avast! Recording Co. in Seattle, Washington, and Martsch's studio, The Manhouse, in Boise, Idaho. Ancient Melodies of the Future was released in 2001 by Warner Bros.

Track listing
All songs written by Doug Martsch. 
 "Strange" - 4:00
 "The Host" - 3:55
 "In Your Mind" - 3:46
 "Alarmed" - 5:07
 "Trimmed and Burning" - 4:19
 "Happiness" - 3:41
 "Don't Try" - 3:17
 "You Are" - 3:51
 "Fly Around My Pretty Little Miss" - 2:45
 "The Weather" - 4:35

Personnel
Doug Martsch - vocals, guitar, keyboards, percussion
Brett Nelson - bass, drums
Scott Plouf - drums, percussion, bass
Additional musicians
Sam Coomes - keyboard on "Strange," "Alarmed," and "The Weather"
Brett Netson - guitar on "The Host," "Trimmed and Burning," "Happiness," and "Don't Try"; thumb piano on "In Your Mind"; hi-hat on "In Your Mind," and "Happiness"

Charts

References

2001 albums
Built to Spill albums
Warner Records albums
Albums produced by Phil Ek
Up Records albums
Albums recorded at Bear Creek Studio